This is a pair of lists of terrestrial lakes with a surface area of more than approximately , ranked by area, excluding reservoirs and lagoons.

The area of some lakes can vary considerably over time, either seasonally or from year to year. This is especially true of salt lakes in arid climates.
This list therefore excludes seasonal lakes such as Kati Thanda–Lake Eyre (maximum area ), Mar Chiquita Lake (Córdoba) (maximum area ), Lake Torrens (maximum area ) and Great Salt Lake (maximum area, 1988).

The Caspian Sea is conventionally considered the world's largest lake, but it is centered on an oceanic basin (a fragment of the ancient Tethys Ocean) rather than lying entirely over continental crust as all other lakes do.
Lake Michigan and Lake Huron are conventionally counted as separate lakes, but hydrologically they are a single body of water, which is the world's largest lake by surface area.

Conventional list

Source for the 20 largest lakes (and their areas):

Geological list

See also

 List of lakes by volume
 List of lakes by depth
 List of largest lakes of Europe
 Recursive islands and lakes
 Aral Sea, formerly the fourth largest lake in the world, with an area of 
 Lake Chad, formerly the eleventh largest lake in the world, with an area of 
It has since increased in area under a restoration project.
 List of largest lakes and seas in the Solar System

Notes and references 
Note: Lake areas may slightly vary depending on the sources.
Notes

References

Further reading
 Largest lakes of the former USSR, Water Quality Assessment of the Former Soviet Union (1998). .
 North America: Physical features, The New York Times Guide to Essential Knowledge (2011). .

External links
 
 

Lakes